is a Japanese actress. She was an idol and singer in the 1990s.

Career
She began her career as an idol in the early 1990s, in commercials, then got her first role in a drama in 1992. In 1994, she performed in rabbit-cosplay in duet with future J-pop star Namie Amuro in the children TV show Ponkikies, singing the show's theme song as "Sister Rabbits". She released a few singles and two albums in 1996. Jonathan Crow of AllRovi wrote that she "almost walks away with the film in her hilarious cameo as Sanae Oikawa" in his review for the film Love Letter.

Filmography

Films 
 Love Letter (1995)
 Overdrive (2004)
 Yajikita Dochu Teresuko (2007)
 I Just Didn't Do It (2007)

Television 
 Ghost Soup (1992)
 Shonan Joshiryo Monogatari (1993)
 Toki o Kakeru Shojo (1994)
 Aishiteiru to Ittekure (1995)
 Okami Sandai Onna no Tatakai (1995)
 100 Oku no Otoko (1995)
 Wild de Iko (1997)
 San Shimai Tantei Dan (1998)
 Toshishita no Otoko (2003)
 Kiraware Matsuko no Issho (2006)
 Dondo Bare (2007)
 Osen (2008)

Dubbing 
 Quest for Camelot (1998) - Kayley

Discography

Albums 
 Bottomless Witch (1996)
 One and Only (1996)

Singles 
 "Magic of Love" (1994)
 "Nakanaizoe" (1995)
 "Issun Momo Kintarou" (1995) with Namie Amuro as Sister Rabbits
 "Nande, Nande, Nande?" (1996)
 "Kiss" (1996)
 "Magic" (1996)
 "... of You" (1996)
 "Who Who Who" (1997)
 "Shoobie Doobie Doing!" (1997)
 "Kimi to Boku" (1998)
 "Be with You" (2001)

Theatre 
 The Wizard of Oz on Ice - Dorothy Gale (Early 2000)
 Urinetown - Hope Cladwell (2004)
 Jekyll & Hyde - Emma Carew (2005-2007)
 Pippin - Catherine (2007)
 Big Fish - Jenny Hill (2017)

VHS 
 Visualand (1997)

Commercials 
Ranran has appeared in commercials for several clients:
 Shiseido (cosmetics)
 Lawson (convenience stores)
 Takeda (health drinks)
 Chōya Umeshu (umeshu)
 Morinaga & Company (candy)
 Maruchan (instant noodles)
 Pilot (pens)
 Suzuki (motor scooter)

References

External links 
 Official website
 

Japanese actresses
Japanese television personalities
Living people
1975 births
Singers from Tokyo
21st-century Japanese singers
Horikoshi High School alumni